Ramsey Orta filmed the killing of Eric Garner in New York City on July 17, 2014. His video spurred protests and debate over city police procedure. Following a campaign of police harassment after the video went viral, in 2016 he was sentenced to four years in prison for weapons and drug charges after accepting a plea deal for which the prosecutor agreed to drop charges against his mother. He was released in May 2020.

Imprisonment 

Following his taping of Garner's death, Orta was arrested multiple times. He pled guilty to drug and gun charges in 2016 and received a four-year prison sentence. Orta was transferred multiple times during his imprisonment. As of early 2020, he was in solitary confinement in Collins Correctional Facility. Orta was released in May 2020 and was under court supervision until January 2022. A crowdfunding campaign raised over $200,000 for Orta.

References

Further reading 

 

Year of birth missing (living people)
Living people
New York City Police Department corruption and misconduct
Journalists from New York (state)
Imprisoned journalists